Neo Fantasia is the sixth full-length studio album by J-pop singer Minori Chihara. It was released in December 11, 2013.

Track listing

Minori Chihara albums
2013 albums
Lantis (company) albums